Biramsar is a village in Ratangarh tehsil of Churu district of Rajasthan, India.

Villages in Churu district